This December; It's One More and I'm Free is the debut album by Lydia. It was released on September 27, 2005. On September 28, 2015, to commemorate the 10th anniversary of the album, the band announced they would release the record on vinyl for the first time ever.

Track listing

Notes
 "Fools and Luxury" has two samples at the end that follow into "Laugh Before You Grin". The first is from Kolchak: The Night Stalker and the second is from Mr. Deeds Goes to Town.
 During the song "A Camera Lens and Careful Days", a short monologue can be heard from an interview with George Jung.
 The cover art was designed by Jason Oda.
 Tracks 3, 4, 8 and 9 were re-recorded by the band and on their Hotel Sessions EP in 2009.
 In 2020, the band released a reimagined version of this album called This December (A Favorite Of My Dreams)

Personnel
Band
Leighton Antelman – guitar, vocals, piano
Steve McGraw – guitar, organ
Loren Brinton – drums
Maria Sais De Sicilia - vocals, piano
Evan Aranbul - bass

Additional musicians
Dustin Forsgren– bass on tracks 1, 3 and 10. Backing vocals on tracks 1 and 3.

Production
Produced by Leighton Antelman and Steve McGraw
Mixed by Cory Spotts
Mastered by Jason Livermore

References

External links
Amazon.com Page

Lydia (band) albums
2005 debut albums